Protein FAM46A is a protein that in humans is encoded by the FAM46A gene. Aliases for Fam46A include HBV X-Transactivated Gene 11 Protein, C6orf37, and XTP11. The gene contains 6 introns, and is 6982 base pairs long. The transcribed mRNA is 2231 base pairs long and contains  2 exons, 589 and 1128 base pairs, with 4 alternative splice isoforms.

Expression 
Expression of Fam46A is found to be exceptionally high in Placental tissue, Pineal Gland, and Pituitary Gland with low to moderate expression within Bone Marrow, Uterus, and Salivary glands.

Protein 
The human FAM46A protein is 461 Amino Acids long.

Function 
The function of Fam46A is currently unknown but there is a Variable Number Tandem Repeat in the first exon of Fam46A that has been explored within various populations and have been attempted to be linked to various retinal diseases as well as colon cancer.

References

Further reading